Swing is a computer puzzle game, released for the PlayStation and PC, developed in Germany by the now defunct Software 2000. The game was released in the US under the name Marble Master.  A downgraded version of the game was released for the Game Boy Color.

Released in 1997, the object of the game is to score points by dropping balls onto sets of see-saws, in rows of three or more of the same colour. The twist, however, is that each ball has a different weight, determined by the number written on the front of it. The higher the number, the heavier the ball. This means that if a ball is placed onto one side of the see-saw which is heavier than the total value of the balls on the other side, the balance would be upset, sending the top ball flying across the playing field to land on another column. Cascade 'throws' can be achieved, and the game is over if a column reaches too tall. A variety of bonus balls, all with special uses, also feature.

Reception
In the UK, the Official UK PlayStation Magazine gave the game 6 out of 10. According to them, the game was just 'another tetris clone'. The review also described the difficulty as perching "somewhere between the taxing and the brutal."

Legacy
In 1999, a sequel was released: Swing Plus: Total Mind Control. The game was never released outside Germany.

In 2008, a Java open source remake was made named XSwing Plus and released under GPLv2 and CC BY.

In 2015, a remake for Android made in Unity3D was released as Color-X-Plode. One year later it was also released for iOS.

References

1997 video games
DOS games
Game Boy Color games
Java platform games
Marble games
Multiplayer and single-player video games
PlayStation (console) games
Puzzle video games
Software 2000 games
Video games developed in Germany
Windows games